Leulumoega Tuai is a village situated on the northwest coast Upolu island in Samoa. The village is part of the A'ana Alofi 3 Electoral Constituency (Faipule District) which forms part of the larger A'ana political district.

Leulumoega is the traditional center of the A'ana district.

The population of Leulumoega is 1184.

References

Populated places in A'ana